This article lists current estimates of the world population in history. In summary, estimates for the progression of world population since the Late Middle Ages are in the following ranges:

Estimates for pre-modern times are necessarily fraught with great uncertainties, and few of the published estimates have confidence intervals; in the absence of a straightforward means to assess the error of such estimates, a rough idea of expert consensus can be gained by comparing the values given in independent publications. Population estimates cannot be considered accurate to more than two decimal digits; for example, the world population for the year 2012 was estimated at 7.02, 7.06, and 7.08 billion by the United States Census Bureau, the Population Reference Bureau, and the United Nations Department of Economic and Social Affairs, respectively, corresponding to a spread of estimates of the order of 0.8%.

Deep prehistory 

As a general rule, the confidence of estimates on historical world population decreases for the more distant past. Robust population data exist only for the last two or three centuries. Until the late 18th century, few governments had ever performed an accurate census. In many early attempts, such as in Ancient Egypt and the Persian Empire, the focus was on counting merely a subset of the population for purposes of taxation or military service. Published estimates for the 1st century ("AD 1") suggest uncertainty of the order of 50% (estimates range between 150 and 330 million). Some estimates extend their timeline into deep prehistory, to "10,000 BC", i.e., the early Holocene, when world population estimates range roughly between 1 and 10 million (with an uncertainty of up to an order of magnitude).

Estimates for yet deeper prehistory, into the Paleolithic, are of a different nature. At this time, human populations consisted entirely of non-sedentary hunter-gatherer populations, with anatomically modern humans existing alongside archaic human varieties, some of which are still ancestral to the modern human population due to interbreeding with modern humans during the Upper Paleolithic. Estimates of the size of these populations are a topic of paleoanthropology. A late human population bottleneck is postulated by some scholars at approximately 70,000 years ago, during the Toba catastrophe, when Homo sapiens population may have dropped to as low as between 1,000 and 10,000 individuals. For the time of speciation of Homo sapiens, some 200,000 years ago, an effective population size of the order of 10,000 to 30,000 individuals has been estimated, with an actual "census population" of early Homo sapiens of roughly 100,000 to 300,000 individuals.

 Estimates regarding the questions of "how many people have ever lived?" or "what percentage of people who have ever lived are alive today?" can be traced to the 1970s. The more dramatic phrasing of "the living outnumber the dead" also dates to the 1970s, a time of population explosion and growing fears of human overpopulation in the wake of decolonization and before the adoption of China's one-child policy. The claim that "the living outnumber the dead" was never accurate. Arthur C. Clarke in 2001: A Space Odyssey (1968) has the claim that "Behind every man, now alive stand 30 ghosts, for that is the ratio by which the dead outnumber the living", which was roughly accurate at the time of writing.

Recent estimates of the "total number of people who have ever lived" are in the order of 100 billion. The answer depends on the definition of "people", i.e., is only Homo sapiens to be counted, or all of the genus Homo, but due to the small population sizes in the Lower Paleolithic, the order of magnitude of the estimate is not affected by the choice of cut-off date substantially more than by the uncertainty of estimates throughout the Neolithic to Iron Age. Importantly, the estimate is also affected by the estimate of infant mortalities vs. stillborn infants, due to the very high rate of infant mortality throughout the pre-modern period. An estimate on the "total number of people who have ever lived" as of 1995 was calculated by Haub (1995) at "about 105 billion births since the dawn of the human race" with a cut-off date at 50,000 BC (beginning of the Upper Paleolithic), and inclusion of a high infant mortality rate throughout pre-modern history.

Historical population

Before 1950

The following table uses astronomical year numbering for dates, negative numbers corresponding roughly to the corresponding year BC (for example, −10000 = 10,001 BC, etc.). The table starts counting approximately 10,000 years before present, or around 8,000 BC, during the middle Greenlandian, about 1,700 years after the end of the Younger Dryas and 1,800 years before the 8.2-kiloyear event.

From the beginning of the early modern period until the 20th century, world population has been characterized by a faster-than-exponential growth. For the period of Classical antiquity to the Middle Ages, roughly 500 BC to AD 1500, there was also a general tendency of growth (estimated at a factor 4 to 5 over the 2,000-year period), but not strictly monotonic: A noticeable dip in world population is assumed due to the Black Death in the mid-14th century.

1950 to present

For times after World War II, demographic data of some accuracy becomes available for a significant number of countries, and population estimates are often given as grand totals of numbers (typically given by country) of widely diverging accuracies. Some sources give these numbers rounded to the nearest million or the nearest thousand, while others give them without any rounding.

Taking these numbers at face value would be false precision; in spite of being stated to four, seven, or even ten digits, they should not be interpreted as accurate to more than three digits at best (estimates by the United States Census Bureau and by the United Nations differ by about 0.5–1.5%).

By world region

Population estimates for world regions based on Maddison (2007), in millions. The row showing total world population includes the average growth rate per year over the period separating each column from the preceding one.

World Population Estimates, 20 Countries and Regional Totals, 0–2000 AD (in thousands)

References

Further reading

External links
 Historical Estimates of World Population – United States Census Bureau

Estimates
Demographic history